A civilian dictatorship is a form of government different from military dictatorships where the ruling dictator does not derive their power from the military. Among civilian dictatorships, dominant-party dictatorships tend to outlast personalistic dictatorships.

See also
 Dictatorship
 Comparative politics

References 

Constitutional state types
Civil–military relations
Authoritarianism
Dictatorship
Comparative politics